|}

This is a list of Legislative Council results for the Victorian 1964 state election. 17 of the 34 seats were contested.

Results by province

Ballarat 

 Two party preferred vote was estimated.

Bendigo

Doutta Galla

East Yarra

Gippsland 

 Preferences were not distributed.

Higinbotham 

 Two party preferred vote was estimated.

Melbourne

Melbourne North

Melbourne West

Monash 

 Two party preferred vote was estimated.

Northern 

 Preferences were not distributed.

North-Eastern 

 Preferences were not distributed.

North-Western 

 Two party preferred vote was estimated.

Southern

South-Eastern

South-Western

Western

See also 

 1964 Victorian state election
 Candidates of the 1964 Victorian state election
 Members of the Victorian Legislative Council, 1964–1967

References 

Results of Victorian state elections
Victorian Legislative Council
1960s in Victoria (Australia)